The 2023 Nebraska Cornhuskers football team will represent the University of Nebraska as a member of the West Division of the Big Ten Conference during the 2022 NCAA Division I FBS football season. The team will play their home games at Memorial Stadium in Lincoln, Nebraska. The team will be led by first-year head coach Matt Rhule.

Previous season
The Huskers finished the 2022 season 4–8, 3–6 in Big Ten play to finish in sixth place in the West division. The team was coached by Scott Frost for the first three games before he was fired on September 11, 2022. The final nine games were coached by interim head coach Mickey Joseph. On November 26, the school named former Carolina Panthers head coach Matt Rhule as the team's new head coach.

Offseason

Transfers

Incoming

Outgoing

Scholarship recruits

Schedule

References

Nebraska
Nebraska Cornhuskers football seasons
Nebraska Cornhuskers football